Bash-Ilchikeyevo (Başqort İlsekäye) is a rural locality (a village) in Meshchegarovsky Selsoviet, Salavatsky District, Bashkortostan, Russia. The population was 337 as of 2010. There are 6 streets.

Geography 
Bash-Ilchikeyevo is located 40 km southeast of Maloyaz (the district's administrative centre) by road. Russkoye Ilchikeyevo is the nearest rural locality.

References 

Rural localities in Salavatsky District